Jonathon Green (born 20 April 1948 in Kidderminster, Worcestershire) is an English lexicographer of slang and writer on the history of alternative cultures. Jonathon Green is often referred to as the English-speaking world's leading lexicographer of slang, and has even been described as "the most acclaimed British lexicographer since Johnson".

Life and career
Of Jewish origin, Green was educated at Bedford School (1961–1965) and Brasenose College, Oxford (1966–1969) where he read history.

An author, freelance journalist, broadcaster and lecturer, Green's primary activity is the collection and analysis of slang. To this end, he has amassed a database, which – according to Green – holds around 135,000 slang words and phrases, underpinned by c. 650,000 citations (examples of usage). It covers English-language slang since the 16th century and offers the vocabularies of the UK, US, Australia, New Zealand, Ireland and the anglophone Caribbean. This database provides a resource for all his slang-related publications.

For Green, slang is as much a part of the greater English language as any other of its sub-sets such as dialect or technicalities. But unlike those, it opts for an actively oppositional role. With a conscious acknowledgement of the counterculture of the 1960s (in which he played a part and of which he has written) he has termed slang the 'counter-language' and more recently 'the language that says "no"'. Born at the margins it has remained there, even if the secrecy that lay at the heart of older slang cannot resist the information flow of the modern world.

The sixties counterculture was the subject of his first oral history, Days in the Life: Voices from the English Underground 1961–1971 (1988), for which he "interviewed more than 100 of 'the main players', got 500,000 words on tape, [and] a 400,000-word manuscript"; the book emerged around half this length. The study All Dressed Up: The Sixties and the Counterculture (1998) was the source of litigation, from both former Beatle George Harrison and artist Caroline Coon, and was withdrawn for 12 months. In June 2000, Coon received damages of £40,000, plus £33,000 costs, from publisher Random House, for the false claims Green had made.

Authority on slang
The single-volume Chambers Slang Dictionary (Chambers Harrap) was first published in 1998; a second edition appeared in October 2008.

Green's most substantial work in this field is Green's Dictionary of Slang: a three volume slang work which traces, via examples and citations drawn from the last five centuries, the history of the slang vocabulary from the earliest use of every term. It includes slang from across the English-speaking world. It was published in the UK in late November 2010 and in the US in March 2011. An e-book version has been released as part of the Oxford Digital Reference Shelf collection. Green's Dictionary of Slang was awarded the 2012 Dartmouth Medal – an annual award from the Reference and User Services Association (RUSA) recognizing the most outstanding reference work of the year. A website version of Green's Dictionary of Slang was publicly launched in October 2016, and is updated quarterly.

His most recent publications are Sounds and Furies: The Love-Hate Relationship between Women and Slang (Robinson 2019), Language! 500 Years of the Vulgar Tongue (Atlantic Books 2014) and Odd Job Man: Some Confessions of a Slang Lexicographer (Jonathan Cape 2014). Green lives in London, England and Paris, France.

Publications
Language Dictionaries and Related Publications

Newspeak: A Dictionary of Jargon (1983)
The Dictionary of Contemporary Slang (1984, 1992, 1995)
The Slang Thesaurus (1986, 1999)
The A–Z of Nuclear Jargon (1986)
The Dictionary of Jargon (1987 RKP)
Neologisms: A Dictionary of Contemporary Coinages (1991)
Slang Down the Ages: The Historical Development of Slang (1993)
Words Apart: The Language of Prejudice (1996)
Chasing The Sun: Dictionary-Makers and the Dictionaries They Made (1996)
Cassell Dictionary of Slang (1998, 2005)
Big Book of Filth (1999)
Big Book of Being Rude (2000)
Big Book of Bodily Functions (2001)
Talking Dirty: A Slang Phrasebook (2003)
The Stories of Slang (2017)
Sounds and Furies: The Love-Hate Relationship between Women and Slang (2019)

Dictionaries of quotations
Famous Last Words (1979, 1997)
Contemporary Dictionary of Quotations (1982)
The Cynics’ Lexicon (1984)
Cassell Dictionary of Insulting Quotations (1996 Cassell, p/b 1997)

Oral Histories
Days In The Life: Voices from the English Underground 1961–1971 (1988)
Them: Voices from the Immigrant Community in Contemporary Britain (1990)
It: Sex Since the Sixties (1993)

Miscellaneous Publications
The Encyclopedia of Censorship (1990)
All Dressed Up: The Sixties and the Counterculture (1998)
Cutting it Fine: Inside the Restaurant Business, with Andrew Parkinson (2000)
Cannabis: A History (2002)

Contributor
The Language Report, ed. Susie Dent (2005, 2006)
Elsevier Encyclopedia of Language and Linguistics, 2nd edition: contributor, 'Anglophone Slang Lexicography'
Dictionary of National Biography, revised edition: contributor, 'Eric Partridge', 'Sapper [H.C. McNeile]'
Bloomsbury Good Word Guide (1988, 1990, 1994), contributing editor: Slang and Jargon entries

Consultant
Oxford English Dictionary

References

External links

Interviews and podcasts
Jonathon Green on Meet the Author UK
Interview in The Generalist
If there are only thirteen dirty words, how come this book is so big? The Word podcast with Jonathon Green.
Daily Beast Interview 6/12/2016

Reviews
"Wimping it", The Times Literary Supplement, 30 June 2006
Getting off at Gateshead, By Jonathon Green, The Independent, 21 November 2008
Fact and fun with the stars of geek heaven, The Independent, 28 November 2008

1948 births
Living people
English Jewish writers
People from Kidderminster
English lexicographers
People educated at Bedford School
Alumni of Brasenose College, Oxford
English male non-fiction writers
Jewish lexicographers